The Nagylengyel oil field is an oil field located in Nagylengyel, Zala County. It was discovered in 1952 and developed by MOL Group. It began production in 1955 and produces oil.

References

Oil fields in Hungary